Sohail Habib Tajik is a Pakistani civil servant and a police officer who is currently serving as Inspector General of Azad Kashmir Police since June 2021
He belongs to district Charsadda. He is graduate of Khyber Medical College. He completed his MS from London School of Economics, UK. He was best probationer on National Police Academy and was awarded Tamgha e Imtiaz.

References

Living people
Pakistani police officers
Year of birth missing (living people)
Inspector Generals of Azad Kashmir Police